Hecho en China  (literally: Made In China) is a 2012 Mexican road movie directed and written by Gabriel Guzmán Sánchez, and starring Odiseo Bichir. It is produced by Alejandra Garcia and Antonio Urdapilleta for IMAGYX Entertainment, Canal 22 and IMCINE. It was filmed in Mexico and first released on March 7, 2012 at the Guadalajara International Film Festival.

Plot 
Marcos Marquez (Bichir) has just turned 50. He's a serious, respectful, knowing man living in Tijuana, owner of a Chinese restaurant he inherited from his parents. But Marcos isn't thrilled about celebrating his birthday because it reminds him of his vanishing youth dreams.   

But this time it's different: he's just received an invitation to Clara's wedding, the only girlfriend he ever had, as well as threats from a Chinese mobster who's forcing him to sell his business.

Since he hates flying, Marcos decides to drive to the wedding in Monterrey, Nuevo León (a city on the opposite side of the country). What he doesn't know is that Fernando (Hernández), his 18-year-old rebellious employee, is riding in his trunk.

When Marcos finds Fernando, they're forced to ride together, pushing Marcos to experience things he's never had the courage to do, realizing that even though he's 50, he's still capable of making his dreams come true.

Cast 
 Odiseo Bichir as Marcos Márquez
 Víctor Hernández as Fernando Fernández
 Carlos Cobos as Odiseo
 Eduardo España as George
 Claudia Ramírez as Clara
 Mario Zaragoza as Tony (the mechanic)
 Omar Fierro as Homero Garza
 Norma Angélica as Mrs. Gilda
 Taka  as Yang Li
 David Loji as Juan Mao
 David Colorado as Nacho
 David Arauza as Policía de Caminos
 Eduardo Cantú as Marcos (11 years-old)
 Nancy Zhou as Pei-Pei
 Francisco Colmenero as the Narrator

Production 
Hecho en China is one of three winning films of the Primera Convocatoria de Apoyo a la Producción de Largometraje Telefilm Digital (First Digital TV Feature Film Production Competition) organized by Canal 22 (a television station operated by the Mexican Secretariat of Culture) and FOPROCINE (Film Production Fund) through IMCINE (the Mexican Film Institute), to promote the production of Mexican cinema.

The film has the sad distinction of having one of the last screen appearances of actor Carlos Cobos, an Ariel Award winner for the film Pastorela (2011), who died months before the film's premiere.

Reception 
The film received favorable reviews through the festival circuit. Brazilian critics compared some of its sequences with films such as Amélie and the Argentinian Chinese Take-Away (Un cuento chino).

Distinctions

Awards

Festivals

References

External links 
 
 Hecho en China – Film Affinity
 Hecho en China – Production Company
 

2012 films
2010s Spanish-language films
Mexican comedy-drama films
2010s road comedy-drama films
2012 comedy films
2012 drama films
2010s Mexican films